William Sleigh may refer to:
 William Lowrie Sleigh, Scottish businessman
 William Campbell Sleigh, English lawyer and politician